Secretogranin III, also known as SCG3, is a protein which in humans is encoded by the SCG3  gene.

Function

The protein encoded by this gene is a member of the chromogranin/secretogranin family of neuroendocrine secretory proteins. Granins may serve as precursors for biologically active peptides. Some granins have been shown to function as helper proteins in sorting and proteolytic processing of prohormones; however, the function of this protein is unknown.

References

Further reading